Juego de niños (English title: A Child's Play) is a 1995 Mexican horror film, made on analog video, from the then experimental era of Mexican director Leopoldo Laborde.

Plot
A string of serial killings among the children of Mexico City is sending shivers through the community. The story follows a child who holds key to solving the murders and is in danger.

Cast
Francisco Porcallo (Francisco Rey) as Lalo, the protagonist
Alain Rangel as Miguel, the antagonist
Angélica Consuegra as La Maestra, Lalo's teacher
Angelina Neria as La Madre, Lalo's mother
Sheilla Lissette as La Hermana, Lalo's sister
Rogelio Castillo as El Hermano, Lalo's brother
Luis Fernanado Ruíz as El Amigo, one of Lalo's other schoolmates, perhaps Pablito
Esteban Mireles as Comandante Sanchez, the detective investigating the murders
Marilú Carrillo as Dra. Montemar, Sanchez's office associate
Victor Vera as Judicial, Sanchez's field associate

The two other performers playing schoolmates are uncredited, as well as multiple extras and victim in the opening credits.

Crew

See also
The Good Son
Relative Fear

External links

Juego de Ninos (A Child's Play) at Vanguard Cinema, the distributor
Juego de Ninos at Barnes & Noble, with information about the DVD's contents

1995 films
1995 horror films
1990s Spanish-language films
1990s horror thriller films
Mexican horror thriller films
1990s Mexican films